The Executioner of Venice, also known as Blood of the Executioner, is a 1963 Italian swashbuckler film co-written and directed  by Luigi Capuano and starring Lex Barker and  Guy Madison.

Plot

Cast 
 
 Lex Barker as  Sandrigo Bembo
 Guy Madison as Rodrigo Zeno
 Alessandra Panaro as Leonora Danin
 Mario Petri as Boia Guarnieri
 Alberto Farnese as Michele Arcà
 Giulio Marchetti as Bartolo
 Feodor Chaliapin Jr. as Doge Giovanni Bembo
 Franco Fantasia as Pietro
 Raf Baldassarre as Messere Grimani
 Mirella Roxy as Smeralda
 John Bartha as Messere Leonardo

References

External links

  

1963 adventure films
Italian adventure films 
Italian swashbuckler films
Films directed by Luigi Capuano
Films set in Venice
Films scored by Carlo Rustichelli
1960s Italian films